Air Vice Marshal Frederick Crosby Halahan,  (27 May 1880 – 17 October 1965) was a gunnery officer in the Royal Navy during the early years of the 20th century who became involved in early naval aviation efforts.

Naval and Air Force service
Halahan served in the Royal Navy, and was promoted lieutenant on 15 December 1900. He later served through the First World War with the navy and in the Royal Air Force from its establishment in 1918 through to 1930, including posting as commandant of the Royal Air Force College Cranwell in 1926–29. During the Second World War, Halahan rejoined the RAF, serving on the staff of the Directorate of Personal Services.

Screen portrayal
Halahan was portrayed by Walter Hudd in the 1956 film Reach for the Sky as the Cranwell commandant who gives a friendly reprimand to young Douglas Bader for his disregard for service discipline and flight rules. Despite that Bader successfully completed his training and was posted to No. 23 Squadron at RAF Kenley before he famously lost his legs.

References

External links
Air of Authority – A History of RAF Organisation – Air Vice-Marshal F C Halahan
Linley & Jim Hooper's family history pages – Air Vice Marshal Frederick Crosby Halahan

1880 births
1965 deaths
Commanders of the Order of the British Empire
Commanders of the Order of the Crown (Belgium)
Companions of the Distinguished Service Order
Companions of the Order of St Michael and St George
Members of the Royal Victorian Order
Officiers of the Légion d'honneur
People educated at Dulwich College
Recipients of the Croix de guerre (Belgium)
Royal Air Force air marshals
Royal Naval Air Service aviators
Royal Navy officers
Royal Naval Air Service personnel of World War I
Commandants of the Royal Air Force College Cranwell
People from Camberwell
Military personnel from Surrey